David Aaron Jaffe (born April 29, 1955) is an American composer who has written over ninety works for orchestra, chorus, chamber ensembles, and electronics. He is best known for his use of technology as an electronic-music or computer-music composer in works such as Silicon Valley Breakdown, though his non-electronic music has also been widely performed. He is also known for his development of computer music algorithmic innovations, such as the physical modeling of plucked and bowed strings, as well as for his development of music software such as the NeXT Music Kit and the Universal Audio UAD-2/Apollo/LUNA Recording System.

Biography
He attended Ithaca College, where he studied composition with Karel Husa; then Bennington College, where he studied composition, orchestration and counterpoint with Henry Brant and electronic music with Joel Chadabe, receiving a B.A. in music and math in 1978. (Other composition teachers from that time period included Vivian Fine and Marta Ptaszynska. He also studied violin with Jacob and Lilo Glick.)

He received a Doctor of Musical Arts degree from Stanford University in 1983, where he was part of the computer music group at the Stanford Artificial Intelligence Lab, then later CCRMA (the Center for Computer Research in Music and Acoustics). He worked with faculty and colleagues John Chowning, Leland C. Smith, Julius O. Smith and others. In addition to his musical work, he did pioneering research in physical modeling, ensemble timing and other aspects of computer music.

Composing career
Jaffe has taught composition at Stanford, the University of California San Diego, Princeton University and Melbourne University, where he was the MacGeorge Fellow. His music has been issued on ten CDs, including four solo CDs from Well-Tempered Productions, and has been presented by the Saint Paul Chamber Orchestra, the Brooklyn Philharmonic, the San Francisco Symphony, the San Francisco Contemporary Music Players, Chanticleer, Earplay and various choruses, string quartets and other chamber ensembles. His music has been performed at international music festivals, including the Berlin Festival, the Bergen Festival, the ISCM Warsaw Autumn Festival, the Venice Biennale, the Bourges Festival, the American Festival in London, the Music in the Americas festival in Buenos Aires and the Spring in Havana Festival. His works have been broadcast internationally as part of the WGBH radio program "Art of the States." He has received commissions from ensembles such as the Kronos Quartet, the Russian National Orchestra, American Guild of Organists, the Lafayette String Quartet, and Chanticleer, for whom he was the N.E.A. Composer-in-Residence in 1990. (He also received N.E.A. Composer Fellowships in 1982 and 1991, as well as a California Arts Council Fellowship in 2001.) His music is published by Schott Music, Plucked String Editions and Terra Non Firma Press (BMI.)

Musical approach
His musical approach carries forward the American experimentalism of the late American composer Henry Brant (a close friend and mentor), as well as that of Carl Ruggles and Charles Ives. Often based on interrelationships, juxtaposition, and synthesis, Jaffe’s works frequently merge abstract and "representational" material, and draw upon such varied sources as world music, jazz, and historical Western concert styles. Jaffe is credited with pioneering and defining a "maximalist" approach to composition.

In addition, his works often draw upon extra-musical elements such as bird song (in such works as “Impossible Animals,” in which a bird sings with a synthesized human voice”) and political issues (in works such as “No Trumpets, No Drums” based on the Israeli/Palestinian conflict.)

Several of his pieces have focused on the Afro-Cuban musical tradition, including "Underground Economy," for Cuban jazz pianist Hilario Duran, with violin and interactive electronics; and “Bull’s Eye,” for violin, cello and Afro-Cuban percussion.

Jaffe himself is a mandolinist and violinist and has performed such diverse styles as Afro-Cuban charanga, bluegrass, and klezmer, as well as in his own works. He has shared the stage with well-known bluegrass musicians such as Mike Marshall, Tony Trischka and Vassar Clements.

Development of Silicon Valley Breakdown
In 1981, Jaffe received a commission from guitarist David Starobin to write a work for eight guitars, voice and tape. When he returned to Stanford in the fall of 1981, he began work on the computer part. As part of the composition of the tape part, he strove to use Chowning’s FM synthesis technique to simulate plucked strings, as a way of bridging the sonic gulf between the live guitars and the tape, but had only partial success. While playing the Mozart piano quartet, he mentioned to the violist, Alex Strong, that he was working on guitar synthesis. Strong excitedly told him about a new technique he had discovered. After appropriate non-disclosure forms had been signed (Strong was applying for a patent), he showed Jaffe the technique, who was impressed with the clarity and realism of the technique. Returning to CCRMA, Jaffe began working with it, but quickly ran into limitations. He began extending the technique to solve problems of tuning, dynamics, expression, and many other issues, in collaboration with electrical engineering PhD student, Julius Smith.

After the premiere of “May All Your Children Be Acrobats,” which combined the new technique and the FM synthesis-based method, Jaffe created a work for four-channel tape alone, in which the plucked string synthesis technique was further developed. The result, Silicon Valley Breakdown, was premiered at the Venice Biennale in 1983 and has been performed in twenty-eight countries. It is widely regarded as a landmark work in the field [this is a sample of available references].

At the same time, he and Smith presented a paper on the technique at the 1983 International Computer Music Conference. This paper was then published back-to-back with the Karplus/Strong paper in Computer Music Journal. The paper has also appeared in book form in “The Music Machine,” by MIT Press.

Silicon Valley Breakdown also included innovations in simulated ensemble synchronization and the development of the Time Map. This work is described in the article Ensemble Aspects of Computer Music, published in Computer Music Journal.

The finale from the piece was included in The Digital Domain, one of the first compact discs ever made, created to showcase the new CD technology. It was released by Elektra/Asylum in 1983. The work has also been released on several CDs, including XXIst century mandolin and Dinosaur Music.

The Radio-Drum and The Seven Wonders of the Ancient World 
Since 1990, he has written extensively for an electronic controller called the "Radio-drum," (aka radiodrum) originally developed by Bob Boie and Max Mathews as a three-dimensional mouse at Bell Labs in New Jersey. Jaffe has used it in such works as the "Seven Wonders of the Ancient World," which Joshua Kosman of the San Francisco Chronicle praised for the "resourceful intricacy and variety of Jaffe's writing". These works have been developed in close collaboration with percussionist/composer Andrew Schloss. Jaffe and Schloss describe their approach in a number of articles, including The Computer-Extended Ensemble, published in Computer Music Journal in 1994.

In Racing Against Time, for Radio-drum-controlled electronics, two saxophones, two violins and piano, Jaffe used the SynthCore sound engine (designed at Staccato Systems, Inc., later branded as SoundMax after acquisition of Staccato Systems by Analog Devices, Inc.) to synthesize physical models of electric guitar, jet fly-by, and car engine effects.

Other works for Radio-drum include Underground Economy, for Cuban improvising pianist, violinist and Radio-drum; and Wildlife, for Zeta violin and Radio-drum.

Jaffe has also written for the Radio Baton (of Max Mathews), a close relative of the Radio-drum, in such works as Terra Non Firma, for four cellos and Radio Baton-conducted electronics, released on the CDs "Music for Radio Drum and Radio Baton" (Centaur Records) and "Music for Instruments and Electronics by David A. Jaffe" (Well-Tempered Productions.)

Most recently, he collaborated with Seattle sound artist/inventor Trimpin to create The Space Between Us, described below.

The Space Between Us, a tribute to Henry Brant
Jaffe first met Trimpin in Seattle through Andrew Schloss, who was in the process of commissioning a work from Jaffe (with support from the Canada Arts Council) for Radio-drum-controlled piano and string quartet. However, in view of the similarity to The Seven Wonders..., Jaffe wanted to transform the project into one that would explore new territory. After Henry Brant's death, when Jaffe inherited Brant's percussion instruments (18 chimes, a xylophone and a glockenspiel.) He traveled to Santa Barbara to visit Brant's widow and pack up the instruments for shipping, and learned that Trimpin had also inherited some of Brant's instruments (Trimpin and Brant had been planning a collaboration that never came to fruition.) Jaffe approached Trimpin with a proposal to transform the Brant instruments into robotic devices. The piece took its final form when Charles Amirkhanian and Other Minds joined the commission consortium, along with a grant from the James Irvine Foundation. The instrumentation was augmented to include a second string quartet. In The Space Between Us, the chimes are hung from the ceiling above the audience, the xylophone is split in two and placed at the extreme left and right of the stage and the glockenspiel and a Disklavier piano are on stage. All of the percussion and piano are controlled by the Radio-drum and the strings are positioned in the aisles surrounding the audience, with two cellos in the extreme rear of the hall, followed (rear-to-front) by violas, violins II and violins I. The work was premiered on March 4, 2011 at the 2011 Other Minds Festival in San Francisco. In his program notes Jaffe wrote that the piece "explores what can be communicated and what must remain unsaid as eight isolated string players embedded in the audience, and one percussionist alone on stage, reach out to one another.". Reviews of the concert can be found at the following references: and. The work was subsequently performed at Open Space in Victoria, BC, Canada (2013) and on the Wayward Music Series at the Good Shepherd Center in Seattle (2016). The latter was supported by a grant from New Music USA  the Nonsequitur.

Music and audio software
From 1988 to 1991, Jaffe worked at Steve Jobs' start-up company NeXT, developing music software for the NeXT Computer. As the first computer to ship with a DSP capable of real-time sound synthesis, Jaffe and Julius Smith collaborated to create a programmable environment called the Music Kit, which fused elements of Music 5 and MIDI in an object-oriented environment.

In the mid-1990s, he developed the sound for games such as Welcome to West Feedback, and Quest for Fame, collaborating with bands such as Aerosmith, for the Boston-based company Ahead (later Virtual Music Entertainment). These games used a custom guitar controller and pick called the "vPick", and were precursors to products such as Guitar Hero.

In the late 1990s, he was a co-founder of Staccato Systems, and developed the SynthCore sound engine. Staccato Systems was acquired by Analog Devices in 2001, where Jaffe continued as Chief Architect and developed SoundMAX (which has shipped on over 80 million PCs) and VisualAudio, presented at the 2006 Audio Engineering Society Conference in New York.

Since 2006, he has been Senior Scientist/Engineer at Universal Audio, where he developed the DSP system for the UAD-2, Satellite, Apollo and RealTime Rack hardware, used to emulate classic analog hardware and do high resolution audio I/O.

He has been awarded several patents, as well as awards from the Bourges Festival and the International Engineering Consortium.

See also
Andrew Schloss
Henry Brant
radiodrum
Trimpin

References

External links
David A. Jaffe's home page

1955 births
Living people
20th-century classical composers
American male classical composers
People from Newark, New Jersey
American classical composers
21st-century classical composers
21st-century American composers
20th-century American composers
20th-century American male musicians
21st-century American male musicians